Medardo Antonio Martínez Morales (born October 20, 1988) is a Nicaraguan footballer who currently plays in  midfield for Managua.

Club career
He started his career at hometown club Xilotepelt before moving to Walter Ferretti. He joined Managua in summer 2012.

International career
Martínez made his debut for Nicaragua in a November 2011 FIFA World Cup qualification match against Dominica and has, as of December 2013, earned a total of 6 caps, scoring no goals. He has represented his country in 1 FIFA World Cup qualification match and played at the 2013 Copa Centroamericana

References

External links 
 
 Profile - FENIFUT

1988 births
Living people
People from Carazo Department
Association football midfielders
Nicaraguan men's footballers
Nicaragua international footballers
C.D. Walter Ferretti players
Managua F.C. players
2013 Copa Centroamericana players
2014 Copa Centroamericana players